Since Slovenia declared independence in 1991, its Governments have underscored their commitment in improving cooperation with neighbouring countries and to actively contribute to international efforts aimed at bringing stability to Southeast Europe. Resource limitations have nevertheless been a problem hindering the efficiency of the Slovenian diplomacy. In the 1990s, foreign relations, especially with Italy, Austria and Croatia, triggered internal political controversies. In the last eight years, however, a wide consensus has been reached among the vast majority of Slovenian political parties to jointly work in the improvement of the country's diplomatic infrastructure and to avoid politicizing the foreign relations by turning them into an issue of internal political debates.

Multilateral

 Slovenia is engaged with 29 countries in bilateral military exchange - most actively with the United States - and in regional cooperative arrangements in Central and Southeast Europe. Slovenia participates in five major multinational regional peacekeeping bodies;
 Together with Hungary and Italy, Slovenia formed a Multinational Land Force (the so-called Trilateral Brigade) in April 1998 with regional peacekeeping ability. Further non-military cooperation within the Trilateral includes the fields of transportation infrastructure, fighting money laundering and organized crime, WMD non-proliferation, border controls, and environmental protection;
 Slovenia is a member of Central European Nations Cooperation on Peacekeeping (CENCOOP), together with Austria, Croatia, Czech Republic, Romania, Slovakia, and Switzerland. Within this organization, a combined infantry peacekeeping unit was formed March 1998;
 Slovenia has observer status, like the United States, in (the Turkish proposed) Multinational Peacekeeping Force Southeast European (MPFSEE), with other participants being Albania, Bulgaria, Greece, Italy, North Macedonia, Romania, and Turkey;
 Slovenia joined 13 other nations in forming the brigade-sized Standby High-Readiness Brigade (SHIRBRIG), headquartered in Copenhagen;
 From May to July 1997, Slovenia contributed to Operation ALBA in Albania with a 25-person medical unit, which was well received and commended by the Italian commander. Thereafter, it continued to support efforts to restore stability in Albania by participating in the WEU's Multinational Advisory Police Element (MAPE) helping to reconstitute and train Albanian police. The government has pledged to the Albanian Government its continuing support;
 Since November 1997, Slovenia has participated in its first United Nations peacekeeping operation, contributing 27 troops to an Austrian UNFICYP contingent on Cyprus. Slovenia also has peacekeepers with the UN at Naharya Ogl, Israel, on the Lebanese border.

Meeting NATO/Partnership for Peace/EAPC goals
 Slovenia's 10th battalion for international cooperation, established in 1996 as its primary "out-of-country" operation unit, will soon be upgraded to a NATO-interoperable rapid reaction peacekeeping force;
 In November 1998, Slovenia hosted its first major multinational exercise, "Cooperative Adventure Exchange," involving almost 6,000 troops from 19 NATO and PfP countries; otherwise it participates actively in PfP and EAPC;
 Slovenia is an active participant in Southeast European Defense Ministerial (SEDM) activities. It agreed to be lead country for several initiatives in 1999, including hosting an environmental security seminar.

Contributions to Bosnian stability
 Slovenia contributed to IFOR (logistical support) and is very engaged in the SFOR effort, providing VIP support helicopter and light transport aircraft missions and use of an airbase in southern Slovenia;
 Slovenia has provided a platoon of military police (about 22) for the Italian-led Multinational Specialized Unit (MSU) in Sarajevo since January 1999;
 Slovenia's latest initiative is its International Trust Fund for Demining and Humanitarian Assistance in Bosnia and Herzegovina, which will finance up to $56 million in mine removal and victim rehabilitation services in the region. (The U.S. has contributed over $35 million in matching funds.)

Relations with neighbors
Slovenia's bilateral relations with its neighbors are generally good and cooperative. However, a few unresolved disputes with Croatia remain. They are related mostly to the succession of the former Yugoslavia, including demarcation of their common border. In addition, unlike the other successor states of the former Yugoslavia, Slovenia did not normalize relations with the "Federal Republic of Yugoslavia" (Serbia and Montenegro) until after the passing from power of Slobodan Milošević; although the Slovenes did open a representative office in Podgorica to work with Montenegrin President Milo Đukanović's government.

Succession issues, particularly concerning liabilities and assets of the former Yugoslavia, remain a key factor in Slovenia's relations in the region. On the whole, no conflicts mar relations with neighbors, which are on a sound footing. Numerous cooperative projects are either underway or envisioned, and bilateral and multilateral partnerships are deepening. Differences, many of which stem from Yugoslavia's time, have been handled responsibly and are being resolved.

Diplomatic relations

List of countries which Slovenia established diplomatic relations with:

Bilateral relations

Africa

Americas

Asia

Europe

See also
 List of diplomatic missions in Slovenia
 List of diplomatic missions of Slovenia
 List of ambassadors to Slovenia
 Foreign relations of Yugoslavia

References

External links

 
Government of Slovenia
Politics of Slovenia